Tiny World is an English nature documentary television series created by Tom Hugh-Jones, and narrated by Paul Rudd. The series premiered on October 2, 2020 on Apple TV+, with a second season premiering on April 16, 2021.

Premise 
Tiny World "showcases nature’s lesser-known tiny heroes. Spotlighting small creatures and the extraordinary things they do to survive, each episode is filled with surprising stories and spectacular cinematography."

Episodes

Series overview

Season 1 (2020)

Season 2 (2021)

Production 
Tiny World creator Tom Hugh-Jones says filming took about one year, but if all filming days were added up, it would total nearly 10 years of shooting to capture nearly 200 species of small animals. Altogether, they filmed about 3160 hours of footage with around 20 teams at different locations around the world.

The idea to have Paul Rudd narrate Tiny World came from his recent role as Ant-Man.

Critical reception 
Tiny World has been universally acclaimed. Decider said, "the spectacular cinematography on Tiny World is more than enough to tune in, but the storytelling and Paul Rudd’s narration support the cinematography well." TV Insider called the series "visually captivating". saying it "will convince you to look closer at the world's more minute inhabitants."

References

External links 

 Tiny World – official site
 Tiny World on IMDb
Tiny World at Metacritic
Tiny World at Rotten Tomatoes

Tiny World
English-language television shows
2020 American television series debuts
2021 American television series endings
Apple TV+ original programming
Documentaries about animals